Robert Stafford Curry was a Democratic member of the Mississippi House of Representatives from 1922 to 1924.

Biography 
Robert Stafford Curry was born on August 1, 1862, in Carrollton, Pickens County, Alabama, the son of John Madison Curry and Lucy (Chapman) Curry. He married Williametta Lipsey in 1885. He practiced medicine by career. He was elected to the Mississippi House of Representatives, representing Hinds County, in 1920 to succeed resigning member William Hemingway and served in the last (1922) session of the term. He was a Democrat.

References 

1862 births
Year of death missing
Democratic Party members of the Mississippi House of Representatives
People from Pickens County, Alabama